The 2010–11 Football League 2 was the 28th season since the official establishment of the third tier of Greek football in 1983. It started on September 12, 2010.

It's the first season with championship's new name, after its change from Gamma Ethniki to Football League 2.

Southern Group

Teams

In the Southern Group participate teams from Attica, Peloponnese, West Greece, Crete, South Aegean and Ionian Islands. Teams which participate are:
Agia Paraskevi, Aias Salaminas, Apollon Smyrni, Aspropyrgos, Vyzas, Iraklis Psachna, Keravnos Keratea, Korinthos, Olympiakos Hersonissos, Panegialios, Panachaiki, Paniliakos, Platanias, Rodos, PAO Rouf, Chania.

League table

Northern Group

Teams

In the Northern Group participate teams from West Macedonia, Central Macedonia, East Macedonia and Thrace, Epirus, Central Greece and Thessaly. Because the number of teams in the Southern Group was bigger Zakynthos and Kalloni will participate in the North Group and not in the South after both teams submitted a request. So the teams that participate in this group are: Aetos Skydra, Anagennisi Epanomi, Anagennisi Giannitsa, Doxa Kranoula, Eordaikos 2007, Ethnikos Filippiada, Fokikos, Kalloni, Kozani, Makedonikos, Megas Alexandros Irakleia, Nafpaktiakos, Niki Volos, Odysseas Anagennisi, Pontioi Katerini, Tyrnavos, Zakynthos.

League table

References

Third level Greek football league seasons
3
Greece